Patricia Sosa (born January 23, 1956) is an Argentine singer and actress.

Biography
Born in Buenos Aires, Patricia Sosa began her career in 1975, with the cover band Nomady Soul. She created the rock band La Torre with her husband Oscar Mediavilla, Ricardo and Gustavo Giles, Luis Múscolo and Carlos García López in 1981, which was an immediate success, and played in the 1982 B.A. Rock. The band made several international tours, even to the Soviet Union.

Patricia Sosa left the band in 1990, to start a solo career. Her first CD was self-titled, and followed by a live EP. Her second CD, "Luz de mi vida", became gold 25 days after release, and platinum in three months. It received 5 nominations for the ACE awards. In 1994, she appeared as a guest artist on Plácido Domingo's Grammy-nominated album, De Mi Alma Latina.

In 1998 she worked as a lead actress in Rodolfo Rojas D.T., and the following year she wrote the book Código de barrio. She also worked in the TV series Chiquititas.

On 12 December 2014 Patricia Sosa was soloist with the Roman choir Música Nuova in a performance of Ariel Ramírez' Misa Criolla in St. Peter's Basilica, Rome in the presence of Pope Francis. 2014 was the fiftieth anniversary of the work's composition and the performance was directed by Facundo Ramírez, son of the composer.

She is a vegetarian.

References

External links
 Official site 

Argentine rock singers
Argentine actresses
Argentine women writers
Singers from Buenos Aires
Living people
1956 births
20th-century Argentine women singers
21st-century Argentine women singers
Argentine people of Spanish descent